The ASA physical status classification system is a system for assessing the fitness of patients before surgery. In 1963 the American Society of Anesthesiologists (ASA) adopted the five-category physical status classification system; a sixth category was later added. These are:
Healthy person.
Mild systemic disease.
Severe systemic disease.
Severe systemic disease that is a constant threat to life.
A moribund person who is not expected to survive without the  operation.
A declared brain-dead person whose  organs are being removed for donor purposes.

If the surgery is an emergency, the physical status classification is followed by "E" (for emergency) for example "3E". Class 5 is usually an emergency and is therefore usually "5E". The class "6E" does not exist and is simply recorded as class "6", as all organ retrieval in brain-dead patients is done urgently. The original definition of emergency in 1940, when ASA classification was first designed, was "a surgical procedure which, in the surgeon's opinion, should be performed without delay," but is now defined as "when [a] delay in treatment would significantly increase the threat to the patient's life or body part."

Limitations and proposed modifications
These definitions appear in each annual edition of the ASA Relative Value Guide. There is no additional information that can be helpful to further define these categories.

An example of an ASA status classification system is that used by dental professionals.  Many include the 'functional limitation' or 'anxiety' to determine classification which is not mentioned in the actual definition but may prove to be beneficial when dealing with certain complex cases. Often different anesthesia providers assign different grades to the same case.

Some anesthesiologists now propose that like an 'E' modifier for emergency, a 'P' modifier for pregnancy should be added to the ASA score.

Uses
While anesthesia providers use this scale to indicate a person's overall preoperative health, it may be misinterpreted by hospitals, law firms, accrediting boards and other healthcare organizations as a scale to predict risk, and thus decide if a patient should have – or should have had – an operation. For predicting operative risk, other factors – such as age, presence of comorbidities, the nature and extent of the operative procedure, selection of anesthetic techniques, competency of the surgical team (surgeon, anesthesia providers and assisting staff), duration of surgery or anesthesia, availability of equipment, medications, blood, implants and appropriate postoperative care – are often far more important than the ASA physical status.

History 

In 1940–41, ASA asked a committee of three physicians (Meyer Saklad, Emery Rovenstine, and Ivan Taylor) to study, examine, experiment and devise a system for the collection and tabulation of statistical data in anesthesia which could be applicable under any circumstances. This effort was the first by any medical specialty to stratify risk. While their mission was to determine predictors for operative risk, they quickly dismissed this task as being impossible to devise. They state:

"In attempting to standardize and define what has heretofore been considered 'Operative Risk', it was found that the term ... could not be used. It was felt that for the purposes of the anesthesia record and for any future evaluation of anesthetic agents or surgical procedures, it would be best to classify and grade the person in relation to his physical status only."

They described a six-point scale, ranging from a healthy person (class 1) to one with an extreme systemic disorder that is an imminent threat to life (class 4). The first four points of their scale roughly correspond to today's ASA classes 1–4, which were first published in 1963. The original authors included two classes that encompassed emergencies which otherwise would have been coded in either the first two classes (class 5) or the second two (class 6). By the time of the 1963 publication of the present classification, two modifications were made. First, previous classes 5 and 6 were removed and a new class 5 was added for moribund persons not expected to survive 24 hours, with or without surgery. Second, separate classes for emergencies were eliminated in lieu of the "E" modifier of the other classes.  The sixth class is now used for declared brain-dead organ donors. Saklad gave examples of each class of patient in an attempt to encourage uniformity. Unfortunately, the ASA did not later describe each category with examples of patients and thus actually increased confusion.

Original definition by Saklad et al.

See also
 Anesthetic equipment
 Anesthetics
 BIS monitor to assess the depth of anesthesia
 Perioperative mortality
 :Category:Medical scales

References

Anesthesia
Medical scales
Patient safety